Seppe Van Holsbeke (born 19 January 1988) is a Belgian fencer. He competed in the men's sabre event at the 2016 Summer Olympics.

References

External links
 

1988 births
Living people
Belgian male fencers
Belgian sabre fencers
Olympic fencers of Belgium
Fencers at the 2016 Summer Olympics
Place of birth missing (living people)
European Games competitors for Belgium
Fencers at the 2015 European Games